The  Dallas Texans season was the fourth and what would become their final season for the Texans. They finished with a record of 3–9, finishing 3rd in the American Conference. The Texans would lose the first round playoff game vs the Detroit Drive.

Regular season

Schedule

Standings

z – clinched homefield advantage

y – clinched division title

x – clinched playoff spot

Playoffs

Roster

External links
1993 Dallas Texans on ArenaFan

1993 Arena Football League season
Dallas Texans (Arena) seasons
1993 in sports in Texas